The Padirac Chasm (French: Gouffre de Padirac) is a cave located near Gramat, in the Lot department, Occitanie region, France.

Features
Visitors descend 75 m via a lift or a staircase before entering into the cave system. The cave contains a subterranean river system that is partly negotiable by boat, and it is regarded as "one of the most extraordinary natural phenomena of the Massif Central".

Formation
The chasm was created at an undetermined point in time when the roof collapsed into a large internal cavern. It is known that the cavern existed in the 3rd century, and was inhabited during the 15th and 16th centuries, when potassium nitrate was excavated from the area.

Tourism

The first tourists visited the cave on 1 November 1898; however, the site was officially opened for tourism on 10 April  1899 by Georges Leygues, the 87th prime minister of France (then called président du conseil).

Since the 1930s, visitors can access the cave system by descending 75 m by lift or stairs, and then exploring the chasm system on foot and by boat.

Padirac is the most frequently visited underground tourism facility in France, with more than 350,000 visitors annually, and a record of 460,000 in 1991.

Exploration
The chasm was first explored, in 1889, by Édouard-Alfred Martel. Much of the credit for opening the cave system is owed to Guy de Lavaur (1903–1986), who came to Padirac in 1938 and managed to penetrate  of the passages.

References

External links

 Le Gouffre de Padirac official website

Show caves in France
Limestone caves
Tourist attractions in Lot (department)
Caves of Lot (department)